Esztergályhorváti is a village in Zala County, Hungary.

References

External links
http://index.hu/belfold/2017/09/13/esztergalyhorvati_menekultek_nyaraltatas_rendelet_idegengyulolet/#

Populated places in Zala County